In law, a joinder is the joining of two or more legal issues together. Procedurally, a joinder allows multiple issues to be heard in one hearing or trial and occurs if  the issues or parties involved overlap sufficiently to make the process more efficient or fairer. That helps courts avoid hearing the same facts multiple times or seeing the same parties return to court separately for each of their legal disputes. The term is also used in the realm of contracts to describe the joining of new parties to an existing agreement.

Criminal procedure
Joinder in criminal law refers to the inclusion of additional counts or additional defendants on an indictment. In English law, charges for any offence may be joined in the same indictment if those charges are founded on the same facts or form or are a part of a series of offences of the same or a similar nature. A number of defendants may be joined in the same indictment even if no single count applies to all of them if the counts are sufficiently linked. The judge retains the option to order separate trials.

Civil procedure
Joinder in civil law falls under two categories: joinder of claims and joinder of parties.

Joinder of claims
Joinder of claims refers to bringing several legal claims against the same party together. In U.S. federal law, joinder of claims is governed by Rule 18 of the Federal Rules of Civil Procedure. These rules allow claimants to consolidate all claims that they have against an individual who is already a party to the case. Claimants may bring new claims even if these new claims are not related to the claims already stated; for example, a plaintiff suing someone for breach of contract may also sue the same person for assault. The claims may be unrelated, but they may be joined if the plaintiff desires.

Joinder of claims requires that the court have jurisdiction over the subject matter of each of the new claims, and that joinder of claims is never compulsory. A party who sues for breach of contract can bring his suit for assault at a later date if he chooses. However, if the claims are related to the same set of facts, the plaintiff may be barred from bringing claims later by the doctrine of res judicata, e.g. if a plaintiff sues for assault and the case is concluded, he may not later sue for battery regarding the same occurrence.

Joinder of parties
Joinder of parties also falls into two categories: permissive joinder and compulsory joinder.

Federal Rule of Civil Procedure No. 20 addresses permissive joinder. Permissive joinder allows multiple plaintiffs to join in an action if each of their claims arise from the same transaction or occurrence, and if there is a common question of law or fact relating to all plaintiffs' claims. For example, several landowners may join together in suing a factory for environmental runoff onto their property. Permissive joinder is also appropriate to join multiple defendants, as long as the same considerations as for joining multiple plaintiffs are met. This often occurs in lawsuits regarding faulty products; the plaintiff will sue the manufacturer of the final product and the manufacturers of any constituent parts. The court must have personal jurisdiction over every defendant joined in the action.

Compulsory joinder is governed by Federal Rule of Civil Procedure 19, which makes it mandatory that some parties be joined. Parties that must be joined are those necessary and indispensable to the litigation. The rule includes several reasons why this might be true, including if that party has an interest in the dispute that they will be unable to protect if they are not joined. For example, if three parties each lay claim to a piece of property and the first two sue each other, the third will not be able to protect his (alleged) interest in the property if he is not joined. Another circumstance is when a party might end up with inconsistent obligations, for example he may be required by two different courts to grant two different parties exclusive rights to the same piece of property. This is avoided by joining the parties in one lawsuit. However, while "necessary" parties must be joined if that joinder is possible, the litigation will continue without them if joinder is impossible, for example, if the court does not have jurisdiction over the party. By contrast, if "indispensable" parties cannot be joined, the litigation cannot go forward. Courts have some discretion in determining what parties are indispensable, though the Federal Rules provide some guidelines.

Timing
Rules 18 and 20 have different effects depending on when they are invoked.  Joinder may occur as part of an original pleading.  There is a discretionary period after the initial filing, during which original pleadings may be amended as a matter of course.  Parties or claims or both may be joined during this time.  However, if the time for modifying the pleadings has passed, the pleading can be amended with the permission of the opposing party or the judge, though this permission is frequently granted.  Rule 15 describes the process for amending a claim.

Under Rule 42 of Federal Rules of Civil Procedure, the court, if actions involve a common question of law or fact, may join any or all issues, consolidate the actions or issue any other orders to avoid unnecessary cost or delay. The court may also order a separate trial of one or more separate issues or claims for convenience, to avoid prejudice, or to expedite or improve economy.

Contract law
Joinder agreements are commonly used in mergers and acquisitions to bind individual shareholders to the terms of an existing merger agreement or shareholder agreement, and in trust practice to bind a donor to the terms and conditions of the trust.

References

American legal terminology
Civil procedure
Civil procedure legal terminology
Criminal law legal terminology
Common law legal terminology
English legal terminology